Midlothian High School could refer to:

Midlothian High School (Texas) in Midlothian, Texas
Midlothian High School (Virginia) in Midlothian, Virginia